Krantisinh Nana Patil College of Veterinary Science is a veterinary college in Shirwal, Satara district that was established in December 1988 under the auspices of Mahatma Phule Krishi Vidyapeeth rahuri. Consequent upon establishment of Maharashtra Animal and Fishery Sciences University at Nagpur, the institute was transferred under its control in the year 2000.

References

Education in Satara district
Veterinary schools in India
Educational institutions established in 1988
1988 establishments in Maharashtra